Kudryashov and Kudryashova (feminine) is a common Russian surname. Notable people with the surname include:

Aleksandr Kudryashov (born 1974), Russian football player
Andrey Kudryashov (born 1991), Russian speedway rider
Dmitri Kudryashov (born 1983), Russian football player
Dmitry Kudryashov (boxer) (born 1985), Russian boxer
Fyodor Kudryashov (born 1987), Russian football player
German Kudryashov (born 1964), Russian football player
Olga Kudryashova (born 1978), Belarusian biathlete
Pavel Kudryashov (born 1996), Russian football player
Valeriy Kudriashov (born 1984), Ukrainian sailor

Russian-language surnames